Anbanathapuram Vahaira Charities College of Arts and Sciences (abbreviated A.V.C. College) is an autonomous college located in Mayiladuthurai, India.  It was founded in 1955, moved to its present site in 1957, and received autonomous status in 1987. The college has been recognized by the University Grants Commission as a "College with Potential for Excellence".It has been accredited by NAAC with an "A+" Grade (CGPA 3.46 out of 4).

History

A.V.C College belongs to the A.V Charity founded by Sri S. Ramalingam Pillai in 1806 in memory of his son Thiru Velayutham Pillai. A.V. Charities began its educational services by starting this college in 1955 under the Madras University, followed by A.V.C Polytechnic in 1983 and A. V. C. College of Engineering in 1996.

Academic Programmes
The college offers undergraduates and postgraduate programmes in arts and science affiliated to the Annamalai University. It has been accredited by NAAC with an "A+" Grade (CGPA 3.46 out of 4).

Departments
The college includes the following departments
Tamil
English
History
Economics
Commerce
Mathematics
Physics
Chemistry
Botany
Zoology
Computer Science
Electronic Science
Microbiology
Management Studies
Visual Communication
Biotechnology
Bioinformatics
BPO Management
Physical Education
Wildlife Biology

Programmes of study
The college offers both Day and Evening programmes.

The Day College offers undergraduate majors in English, History, Economics, Commerce, Mathematics, Computer Science, Physics, Chemistry, Botany and Zoology, and taught postgraduate degrees in Economics, Commerce, Mathematics and Wildlife Biology. It also offers research degrees (MPhil and PhD) in Zoology, Commerce, Economics, Tamil, Botany (PhD only), History (PhD only), Chemistry, Mathematics, Physics and Computer Science (MPhil only).

The Evening College offers undergraduate majors and taught postgraduate degrees in Commerce, Computer Science, Electronic Science, Physics, Chemistry, Microbiology, Home Science (undergraduate only), Mathematics, Visual Communication (undergraduate only), Biotechnology, Business Administration (undergraduate only), Commercial Administration, Tamil, English, Botany (postgraduate only) and Zoology (postgraduate only); it also offers various diploma and certificate courses.

Students and facilities

Undergraduate students at the college come mainly from rural areas in its neighbourhood; the college provides transport from a number of locations. In addition, frequent public bus services pass the college, linking it to Mayiladuthurai and to smaller towns to the east.  Hostels for men (150 places) and women (200 places) are located on the campus. Postgraduate students are recruited from a wider area, particularly for courses in the College's specialised research areas such as Wildlife biology.

Sports
A.V.C college won the men's and women's state level volleyball title, held in Dalmiapuram, which was organised jointly by Dalmia Cement Limited and Tiruchi District Volleyball Association (TDVA).

References

External links
Official Website

Educational institutions established in 1955
1955 establishments in Madras State
Academic institutions formerly affiliated with the University of Madras
Colleges affiliated to Annamalai University